Tiar-aleit is a  boma in Tiar-aleit payam,  Aweil South County, Aweil State, South Sudan.  
It is the largest and the headquarters of the Boncuai Community. It is also the educational and business center to the community

Demographics 
According to the Fifth Population and Housing Census of Sudan, conducted in April 2008, Tiar-aleit  boma had a population of 6,288 people, composed of 2,857 male and 3,431 female residents.

Notes

References 

Populated places in South Sudan